Senegalia dudgeonii is a small perennial tree that grows up to 9 meters tall. It belongs to the Fabaceae family and endemic Sudano-Sahelian and Guinea savannah zones of West Africa.

Morphology 
Bark is fissured, brown-reddish with stripes. Alternate, bipinnate leaves, 3-7 cm long, with 20-30 pairs of leaflets, 20 pairs of pinnae.  White or cream flowers, 2.5-6 cm long and usually shorter than leaves.

Distribution 
Senegalia dudgeonii is endemic to the Sudanian and Guinea savannah regions of West Africa with a range spanning Senegal in the west to Central African Republic.

Uses 
Roots of the plant is used to treat snake bites while extracts from the bark is used to treat dysentery and diarrhea.

References 

Flora of West Tropical Africa
dudgeonii